David Jonathan "J. D." Drew (born November 20, 1975) is an American former Major League Baseball right fielder. He is the brother of two other major league players, Stephen and Tim.

College
After graduating from Lowndes County High School in Valdosta, Georgia, Drew attended Florida State University, where he played under head coach Mike Martin. At Florida State, he was the winner of the  Dick Howser Trophy and the 1997 Golden Spikes Award, was named the 1997 Collegiate Baseball Player of the Year, the 1997 Sporting News Player of the Year, and was a consensus All-American (1997). He also was named the 1997 ACC Player of the Year. He was a 1996 member of Team USA. He was the first player in college baseball history to hit 30 home runs and steal 30 bases in the same season. He set a Florida State record by batting .455 in 1997 while becoming one of only three players in college baseball history to have 100 hits, 100 runs and 100 RBIs. During his college career, Drew broke 17 school and conference records.

Professional career

1997: Drafted by the Philadelphia Phillies
The Philadelphia Phillies made Drew the second overall pick, after pitcher Matt Anderson, in the 1997 MLB draft. Drew and his agent Scott Boras chose not to sign with the Phillies, insisting Drew would not sign for less than $10 million. The Phillies had no plan to pay an unproven player this amount of money, and despite Boras' warnings, drafted Drew nonetheless. They offered him $2.6 million. Consequently, Drew ended up playing for the St. Paul Saints of the independent Northern League. Boras had Drew sign with an independent baseball league because of a loophole in the rules of the MLB draft.

1998–2003: St. Louis Cardinals
After playing for St. Paul in the 1997 season, Drew was selected in the first round of the 1998 MLB draft, fifth overall, by the St. Louis Cardinals. In June he signed a $7 million contract, then hit .316 through 26 games with the Triple-A Memphis Redbirds. He was recalled by the Cardinals and made his debut on September 8, 1998—the game in which teammate Mark McGwire broke the single-season home run record previously held by Roger Maris. Drew's first at bat, in the sixth inning, resulted in a strikeout, and he finished the night 0-for-2. He ended up going 15-for-36 (.417) during 1998, with five home runs.

On August 9, on what would have been Drew's first game in Philadelphia, he sat out, citing a bruised right hand. In an attempt to confuse the Philadelphia fans, he did not wear his own jersey that night, which instead was worn by bullpen catcher, Jeff Murphy. The attempt failed, however, and he was booed and heckled throughout batting practice. The only time he received cheers was when he booted three consecutive grounders in the outfield while his teammates were taking batting practice. On August 10, 1999, in Drew's first game at Veterans Stadium in Philadelphia, he was booed loudly, and even had batteries thrown at him by two fans. The Phillie Phanatic got into the act, dropping two large trash bags marked with dollar signs in the outfield between innings. Drew struggled to stay healthy, landing on the disabled list every season he played in St. Louis.

In his book Three Nights in August, Buzz Bissinger mentions former manager Tony La Russa's frustration with Drew's lack of passion. La Russa tells Bissinger that it seems Drew had decided to "settle for 75%" of his talent, in large part because of his enormous contract.

2004: Atlanta Braves
On December 13, 2003, Drew was traded to the Atlanta Braves along with catcher Eli Marrero for starting pitcher Jason Marquis, relief pitcher Ray King, and rookie prospect Adam Wainwright. There, he had the best season of his career while finally managing to stay healthy. In , he displayed excellent power, patience, and defense, hitting .305 with 31 home runs, 118 walks, and 93 RBI, finishing sixth in the MVP voting.

2005–2006: Los Angeles Dodgers
In December 2004, Drew signed a five-year, $55 million contract with the Los Angeles Dodgers, which included an escape clause after the second year. Roughly halfway through the 2005 season, Drew's season was again cut short after being hit on the wrist by a pitch from Arizona Diamondbacks' pitcher Brad Halsey.

On September 18, 2006, Drew was part of only the (then) fourth-ever set of back-to-back-to-back-to-back home runs with fellow Dodgers Jeff Kent, Russell Martin, and Marlon Anderson.

In 2006, Drew exercised his contract opt-out clause, forgoing $33 million over the next three years to become a free agent. Dodgers general manager Ned Colletti said in a teleconference that he was "surprised how it came down. Everything we had heard, everything that had been written led us to believe the player loved being here." This was especially a surprise because a few days before, Drew had told an LA Times columnist on how happy he was in LA and that he was looking forward to the upcoming 2007 season. Drew had a very good season, batting .284 with 20 home runs and 100 RBI.

2007–2011: Boston Red Sox
On January 26, Drew officially signed a five-year contract with the Red Sox worth $70 million. Drew's revised contract had a clause that allowed the Red Sox to opt out of Drew's five-year contract after three or four years if Drew has extensive injuries due to a previously existing problem in his right shoulder.

Drew was again part of a set of four consecutive home runs on April 22, 2007, in a game against the New York Yankees, this time joining with Manny Ramírez, Mike Lowell, and Jason Varitek. He is the only player to participate twice in a string of four straight home runs, and he was the second player to go deep in each instance. Drew finished the 2007 season with a .270 batting average, 11 home runs, and 64 RBI.

On October 20, 2007, Drew hit a grand slam in Game 6 of the 2007 ALCS with the Red Sox facing elimination. The home run, along with brother Stephen Drew's for the Arizona Diamondbacks, marks the third time that two brothers have both hit home runs in the same postseason.

In 2008, Drew hit one of the longest home runs in Fenway Park history. According to the ESPN Home Run Tracker, it was measured at 460 feet. He finished with a .280 average, with an OBP of .408 and a slugging percentage of .519. At the end of June, Drew was named the AL Player of the Month after hitting .337 and hitting 12 home runs while taking over for David Ortiz's three-spot in the lineup while he was on the disabled list. Drew was officially announced as an AL All-Star reserve on July 6. This was Drew's first All-Star game appearance. He hit a two-run homer in his first at-bat as an All-Star en route to winning the game's MVP award. In what was to become the longest All-Star Game time-wise in MLB history, the American League (and Drew's Red Sox) manager Terry Francona, having almost run out of pitchers, contemplated putting Drew, a former high school hurler, on the mound to close the game. "I'd have been ready," Drew said. "I've had an opportunity to throw a lot in the outfield. I don't know if I would have gotten anyone out, but I'd have thrown something up there." Drew later visited the 15-day disabled list, spending from August 27 to September 8 on the DL with a strained lower back.

On October 3, in Game 2 of the 2008 American League Division Series against the Los Angeles Angels of Anaheim, Drew hit a go-ahead two-run home run. On October 16, in Game 5 of the American League Championship Series against the Tampa Bay Rays, Drew helped to bring the Red Sox back from a late-inning seven-run deficit with a two-run home run in the eighth inning and then delivered the walk-off hit in the ninth. The Game 5 comeback, sparked by Drew, is the second-biggest in postseason history and is the largest for a team on the brink of elimination. However, the Red Sox lost to the Rays in the seventh game.

After the 2009 season, Drew's statistics began to decline. That year, he hit .279 with an .392 OBP while hitting 24 home runs and 68 RBI. The following year, he hit .255 with 22 home runs with 68 RBI. However, he played in 139 games, his highest total since 2007 when he joined Boston.  In 2011, Drew hit .222 with four home runs and 22 RBI. He played in 81 games and had a .315 OBP. Drew retired from professional baseball at the end of the 2011 season.

Personal life
Drew's younger brother Tim was also drafted in the first round in 1997, making them the first brothers drafted in the first round of the MLB draft in the same year. They were teammates while on the Atlanta Braves in 2004. J.D., Tim, and their brother Stephen all played in Major League Baseball. J.D. and Stephen each won a World Series with the Boston Red Sox; J.D. in 2007 and Stephen in 2013.

Drew married his girlfriend Sheigh, on November 10, 2001, in Hahira, Georgia. Drew is a Christian.

Career statistics

In 55 postseason games, Drew hit .261 (48-for-184) with 19 runs, six doubles, seven home runs, 25 RBI and 18 walks.

See also
List of Major League Baseball career home run leaders

References

External links

Major League Baseball center fielders
Major League Baseball right fielders
St. Louis Cardinals players
Atlanta Braves players
Los Angeles Dodgers players
Boston Red Sox players
St. Paul Saints players
Arkansas Travelers players
Memphis Redbirds players
Peoria Chiefs players
Palm Beach Cardinals players
American League All-Stars
Major League Baseball All-Star Game MVPs
Golden Spikes Award winners
Florida State Seminoles baseball players
Baseball players from Georgia (U.S. state)
People from Hahira, Georgia
1975 births
Living people
People from Valdosta, Georgia
All-American college baseball players
National College Baseball Hall of Fame inductees
Peninsula Oilers players